Nilanka Sandakan (born 9 June 1996) is a Sri Lankan cricketer. He made his first-class debut for Moors Sports Club in the 2016–17 Premier League Tournament on 15 December 2016. He made his List A debut for Nuwara Eliya District in the 2016–17 Districts One Day Tournament on 15 March 2017.  He made his Twenty20 debut for Moors Sports Club in the 2017–18 SLC Twenty20 Tournament on 24 February 2018.

References

External links
 

1996 births
Living people
Sri Lankan cricketers
Moors Sports Club cricketers
Nuwara Eliya District cricketers
Sri Lanka Navy Sports Club cricketers
Cricketers from Colombo